Neocollyris constricticollis is a species of ground beetle in the genus Neocollyris in the family Carabidae. It was described by Horn in 1909.

References

Constricticollis, Neocollyris
Beetles described in 1909